Amba Ambika Ambaalika,dubbed into Hindi as Mahayudh is a 1976 Indian Malayalam film, directed and produced by P. Subramaniam. The film stars Srividya, Kaviyoor Ponnamma, Hari and Jose Prakash in the lead roles. The film has musical score by G. Devarajan. This film was based on Mahabharata.

Cast
 
Srividya as Amba
Rani Chandra as Ambika
Unnimary as Ambalika
Ushakumari as Teenage Sathyavathi  
Kaviyoor Ponnamma as Old Age Sathyavathi 
Hari as Devavrathan (Bheeshmar's teenage) 
Jose Prakash as Bheeshmar
Raghavan as Saalvan 
Sudheer as Vichitravirya 
Kedamangalam Sadanandan 
Prema as Padmavathi 
Ramachandran as Kalinga Raajaavu 
Sankaradi as Fishermen's King 
Anandavally as Maid Lalitha 
C. I. Paul as Emperor Shanthanu 
Kottarakkara Sreedharan Nair as Parashuraman 
Kuthiravattam Pappu as Madhavyan 
Master Sekhar as Sree Murukan 
Pankajavalli as Sathyavathi's Mother 
Vanchiyoor Madhavan Nair

Soundtrack
The music was composed by G. Devarajan and the lyrics were written by Sreekumaran Thampi.

References

External links
 

1976 films
1970s Malayalam-language films
Films based on the Mahabharata
Films directed by P. Subramaniam